The Cornerhouse is leisure complex in the city centre of Nottingham, England.

Built on the former site of Nottingham's local paper, The Nottingham Evening Post, its attractions include a number of bars and restaurants, a multi-screen cinema operated by Cineworld, a large nightclub called PomPom, a casino and two indoor adventure golf courses.

It is smaller than its neighbouring complexes — Victoria Centre, the Royal Concert Hall and the Theatre Royal — but is bigger than the recently built Trinity Square development.

External links
Official site

Buildings and structures in Nottingham